The Orgues de Flandre, which can be translated as the "Organs of Flanders", are a group of residential buildings in the 19th arrondissement of Paris, France.

Built from 1974 to 1980 by the architect Martin van Trek, the buildings are at 67-107 avenue de Flandre and 14-24 rue Archereau.
 Tour Prélude (or Tower 1): , 38 floors
 Tour Fugue (or Tower 2): , 32 floors
  Tour Cantate (or Tower 3): , 30 floors
  Tour Sonate (or Tower 4): , 25 floors

See also 
 Skyscraper
 List of tallest structures in Paris

External links 
 

Buildings and structures in the 19th arrondissement of Paris
Skyscrapers in Paris
Residential buildings completed in 1980
Brutalist architecture in France
Postmodern architecture
Residential skyscrapers